Barry Bonds (born 1964) is an American former professional baseball player in Major League Baseball.

Barry Bonds may also refer to:
 "Barry Bonds" (song), 2007 hip-hop song by Kanye West
 Barry Bondz (born 1982), American rapper

See also